Deutsche Bank Building was an office skyscraper located at 130 Liberty Street in Manhattan, New York City.

Deutsche Bank Building may also refer to:

Deutsche Bank Center, in New York City, the American headquarters of Deutsche Bank since 2021
60 Wall Street, in New York City, the American headquarters of Deutsche Bank from 2001 to 2021
Deutsche Bank Place, in Sydney
Deutsche Bank Twin Towers, in Frankfurt